Abdoulaye Sylla (born 10 April 2000) is a Guinean professional footballer who plays as a defender for Belgian club Seraing and the Guinea national team.

Club career
Sylla arrived to France in 2011 from Guinea, and that year joined the youth academy of Nantes. He signed his first professional contract with the club on 28 May 2020. He made his professional debut with Nantes in a 1–1 Ligue 1 tie with Nîmes on 28 February 2021.

On 27 July 2022, Sylla signed a two-year contract with Seraing in Belgium.

International career
Sylla debuted for the  Guinea national team in a friendly 2–0 loss to Togo on 5 June 2021.

References

External links
 
 

2000 births
Living people
Sportspeople from Conakry
Guinean footballers
Association football defenders
Guinea international footballers
FC Nantes players
R.F.C. Seraing (1922) players
Ligue 1 players
Championnat National 2 players
Belgian Pro League players
Guinean expatriate footballers
Guinean expatriate sportspeople in France
Expatriate footballers in France
Guinean expatriate sportspeople in Belgium
Expatriate footballers in Belgium
Guinea A' international footballers
2018 African Nations Championship players